Flucindole is an antipsychotic with a tricyclic structure that was never marketed. It is the 6,8-difluoro derivative of cyclindole.

See also 
 5-Fluoro-AMT
 Iprindole

References 

Dimethylamino compounds
Antipsychotics
Carbazoles
Fluoroarenes
Abandoned drugs
Nitrogen heterocycles
Heterocyclic compounds with 3 rings